Anthropology of food is a sub-discipline of anthropology that connects an ethnographic and historical perspective with contemporary social issues in food production and consumption systems. 

Although early anthropological accounts often dealt with cooking and eating as part of ritual or daily life, food was rarely regarded as the central point of academic focus. This changed in the later half of the 20th century, when foundational work by Mary Douglas, Marvin Harris, Arjun Appadurai, Jack Goody, and Sidney Mintz cemented the study of food as a key insight into modern social life. Mintz is known as the "Father of food anthropology" for his 1985 work Sweetness and Power, which linked British demand for sugar with the creation of empire and exploitative industrial labor conditions. 

Research has traced the material and symbolic importance of food, as well as how they intersect. Examples of ongoing themes are food as a form of differentiation, commensality, and food's role in industrialization and globalizing labor and commodity chains.  

Several related and interdisciplinary academic programs exist in the US and UK (listed under Food studies institutions).

"Anthropology of food" is also the name of a scientific journal dedicated to a social analysis of food practices and representations. Created in 1999 (first issue published in 2001), it is multilingual (English, French, Spanish, Portuguese). It is OpenAccess, and accessible through the portal OpenEdition Journals. It complies with academic standards for scientific journals (double-blind peer-review). It publishes a majority of papers in social anthropology, but is also open to contributions from historians, geographers, philosophers, economists. The first issues published include: 
 16 | 2022 Feeding genders
 15 | 2021 Aesthetics, gestures and tastes in South and East Asia: crossed approaches on culinary arts
 14 | 2019 Gastro-politics: Culture, Identity and Culinary Politics in Peru
 13 | 2018 Tourism and Gastronomy
 12 | 2017 Food and Cancer Throughout the World. Experiences of People with Cancer or in Remission
 11 | 2016 Food Cultures and Territories
 10 | 2016 Research / ethics environment in social and human food sciences: debates, constraints, limits and lessons 
 9 | 2015 Children’s food heritage, Anthropological approaches
 8 | 2011 Food heritage
 7 | 2010 Migration, food practices and social relations: when continuity is not reproduction and discontinuity is not rupture
 6 | 2008 Food and survival. Food insecurity in the land of plenty
 5 | 2006 Food and Religion
 4 | 2005 Local Foods
 3 | 2004 Wine and Globalization
 2 | 2003 Milk
 1 | 2003 Crispy, Crunchy: a dream of consistency...
 Issue 0 | 2001 Local food traditions and identities
Special issues (from thematic workshops) include:  
 S13 | 2019 Meat and architecture; butchery work space from slaughter to sale
 S12 | 2018 People Moving with Food from and to Northern Europe
 S11 | 2015 Guardians of the Earth: Challenges of land use
 S10 | 2014 Explorations in cross-national comparison of food practices
 S9 | 2014 Comidas Rituales
 S8 | 2013 Varia AoFood 2013
 S7 | 2012 Nordic Food Culture
 S6 | 2009 Modelos alimentarios y recomposiciones sociales en América Latina
 S5 | 2009 Can consumers save the world?
 S4 | 2008 Food models and social recompositions in Latin America
 S3 | 2008 Food Chains
 S2 | 2007 From local food to localised food
 S1 | 2001 Comparative views on some food practices in Europe

See also
Nutritional anthropology
Sociology of food

References

Anthropology
Food science